This is a list of electoral division results for the 2013 Australian federal election in the state of Tasmania.

Overall result

Results by division

Bass

Braddon

Denison

Franklin

Lyons

References

See also 

 2013 Australian federal election
 Results of the 2013 Australian federal election (House of Representatives)
 Post-election pendulum for the 2013 Australian federal election
 Members of the Australian House of Representatives, 2013–2016

Tasmania 2013